Planet X637Z-43 is a 2015 internet hoax purporting to document the discovery by NASA of a planet covered in cannabis. Supposedly it was one of 715 planets discovered by the Kepler space telescope in 2014. The story originated on a fake news website, NewsWatch28 (also reported as 28 News Watch). 

On October 25, 2019 it was featured in the video of a popular internet personality Felix Arvid Ulf Kjellberg, better known as PewDiePie. In the video, he discusses memes which gained the audience's interest that week, chosen from his subreddit. One of these memes contained Planet X637Z-43, talking about an article made by Huzlers.com. This article has since been taken down. There, they portrayed Planet X637Z-43 to be covered with marijuana (also reported as cannabis). In the meme posted by a reddit user, the purported discovery is discussed in comparison to Elon Musk's striving to explore other planets.

References

2015 hoaxes
2015 in cannabis
Cannabis hoaxes

Fake news
Fictional terrestrial planets